Al Aamriya is a village in southern Qatar, located in the municipality of Al Rayyan.

The village of Umm Hawta, to the north, is nearby.

Etymology
The village was named in honor of an esteemed resident known as "Al-Aamri" who lived in the village until his death.

Gallery

References

Populated places in Al Rayyan